"Solo" (stylized in all caps) is the debut solo single of South Korean singer, rapper, and Blackpink member Jennie. Released on November 12, 2018, through YG and Interscope, the song was written by Teddy Park and produced by him alongside 24. Musically, "Solo" is a dance, pop, and hip hop song with EDM elements. Its lyrical content revolves around the theme of independence after a break-up.

An accompanying music video for the song was directed by Han Sa-min and uploaded to Blackpink's YouTube channel simultaneously with the single's release. The video was filmed in the United Kingdom and depicts Jennie's transformation from an innocent to strong independent woman. The video has accumulated more than 890 million views on the platform.

The single debuted and peaked at number one on the South Korean Gaon Digital Chart. Internationally, it became Jennie's first chart-topper on the Billboard World Digital Songs chart in the United States, and debuted on the charts of several other countries, including Canada, Japan, Malaysia, New Zealand, Scotland, Singapore and the UK. It has received two platinum certifications from the Korea Music Content Association (KMCA): for selling over 2.5 million digital units, and for surpassing 100 million streams.

Recording and composition

In a press conference held on November 12, 2018, Jennie talked about the song's creation. She said, "When you’re dating someone, you tend to present what the other person wants rather than your true self. I wanted to express that feeling. Rather than the heart wound coming from a breakup, I wanted to express myself more freely". While Jennie is not credited as a songwriter, she created the concept behind the song. She told the Hollywood Reporter, "So, I've input a lot of my ideas into the concept, the style and everything. So, I've had a strong connection from the beginning, I guess." "Solo" was written by Teddy Park and produced by him alongside 24. The song is composed in the key of E-flat minor in a tempo 95 beats per minute and runs for 2:49. It has been described as a dance, pop and hip hop song, with EDM elements. SBS''' Kang Kyung-yoon noted that the lyrics follow two themes; a weak introverted girl and an "independent yet strong woman.

Commercial performance
"Solo" debuted at number one on the Gaon Digital Chart on the week ending November 17. Overall, the song stayed in the top ten of the chart for 13 consecutive weeks and spent 33 weeks in the top 100 of the chart. It furthermore topped the component Download and Streaming chart. The CD release of the single charted at no. two of the Gaon Album Chart, selling 45,000 copies in two months making it the 100th best-selling album of 2018. As of April 2021, it sold more than 100,000 copies.  Eventually "Solo" became the 86th and 35th best-performing song of 2018 and 2019 respectively in South Korea. The song was certified platinum by the Korea Music Content Association (KMCA) both for surpassing 100 million streams on June 6, 2019, and for 2.5 million paid digital downloads on March 12, 2020. The song entered the Billboard K-pop Hot 100 on the chart issue dated November 24 at number one. The following week it dropped to no. ten, but reached the top again the following week. It spent 25 weeks on the chart. The song further reached number one in Singapore and Malaysia. In Japan, "Solo" debuted and peaked at number 22 on the Billboard Japan Hot 100 in the week ending November 26. In the United States, "Solo" debuted atop Billboard's World Digital Song Sales chart on the issue dated December 1, 2018. It spent 25 weeks in said chart. The song has sold 10,000 digital copies in the US as of December 2018. "Solo" also reached the single charts in Canada and Scotland, while reaching the UK download component and New Zealand Hot Singles charts.

Release and promotion

On October 18, 2018, YG announced that all Blackpink members were preparing solo releases, with Jennie to release a song in November 2018. On October 27, YG released a promotional poster on various social media accounts. A 23-second teaser video was uploaded one day later onto Blackpink's official YouTube channel. The clip shows Jennie lying on a bed and repeatedly mentioning her name. The second teaser was uploaded one week later, showing her performing in various clothes in a photo studio. The third and last teaser was uploaded four days prior to the singles release, showing her with different outfits in various locations.

"Solo" was released for digital download and streaming on November 12, 2018, through YG and Interscope. A physical version of the single was released on November 18, 2018, featuring the song and it's instrumental. Alongside the CD, a 72-page photobook, a double-sided poster, a random photocard and a lyrics postcard were released in a special version. A live version of "Solo" which was recorded on December 24, 2018, was included on Blackpink's first live album Blackpink Arena Tour 2018 "Special Final In Kyocera Dome Osaka", which was released on March 22, 2019, through YGEX.

Jennie performed "Solo" on several occasions. The single was first performed by Jennie during Blackpink's concert in Seoul's Olympic Gymnastics Arena on November 10 and 11, 2018. She performed "Solo" four times in November and December at SBS' Inkigayo and won three times. Its dance was choreographed by Kiel Tutin, Kyle Hanagami, and Shackkings. In the same month, "Solo" was performed at the SBS Gayo Daejeon, alongside "Ddu-Du Ddu-Du". Furthermore, "Solo" was performed during Blackpink's debut Coachella stage on April 12, 2019.

Remix version
On January 31, 2021, Jennie performed a remix version of "Solo" during Blackpink's livestream concert, The Show. The remix version included an new rap verse written by Jennie and an extended tropical dance break. The remix version of the song was released on June 1, 2021, as part of the live album Blackpink 2021 'The Show' Live''.

Music video
An accompanying music video for the song was directed by Han Sa-min and shot in the United Kingdom.

On January 14, 2021, the music video reached 600 million views on YouTube. With the feat, Jennie became the first female Korean soloist to have a 600 million-view music video ever.

Accolades

Credits and personnel

Credits are adapted from Spotify and Dextor Lab:
Personnel
 Jennie Kim – vocals 
 Teddy Park – producer, writer
 24 – producer, writer
Music video
 Han Sa-min – music video director

Track listing
Download and streaming
 1. "Solo" – 2:49
CD single
 1. "Solo" – 2:49
 2. "Solo" Instrumental – 2:49

Charts

Weekly charts

Monthly charts

Year-end charts

Certifications and sales

Release history

See also
List of Gaon Digital Chart number ones of 2018
List of Kpop Hot 100 number ones
List of Inkigayo Chart winners (2018)
List of certified songs in South Korea

References

2018 songs
2018 debut singles
Songs written by Teddy Park
Interscope Records singles
YG Entertainment singles
Gaon Digital Chart number-one singles
Korean-language songs
Billboard Korea K-Pop number-one singles